Faucaria is a genus of around 33 species of succulent subtropical flowering plants of the family Aizoaceae. The name comes from the Latin word fauces (“animal mouth”) because of the appearance of "teeth" on the leaves.

Faucaria species are native to the Cape Province of South Africa and the Karoo Desert.

Description 

Small plants of 8 cm diameter, with thick triangular leaves. On the edges of the leaves there are upright teeth in opposite pairs that looks like an animal mouth. It may become bushy.

The plants are light green, turning purple if exposed  to strong sunshine.

Golden yellow flowers appear in the center of the rosette.

Species 
Faucaria species accepted by the Plants of the World Online as of November 2022:
Faucaria bosscheana 
Faucaria britteniae 
Faucaria felina 
Faucaria gratiae 
Faucaria nemorosa 
Faucaria subintegra 
Faucaria tigrina 
Faucaria tuberculosa

Cultivation 
Put the plants in small pots with a well-drained soil. In a very sunny exposure and if possible outside in summer.

Moderate watering in summer and not at all in winter for the plant is a rest period without which it can not flourish.

Division of clumps is the easiest way for reproduction. It can also be done by cutting (with a minimum temperature of 21 °C) or by seeding.

References

External links 

 ((fr)) Photos on www.AIAPS.org

Aizoaceae
Succulent plants
Aizoaceae genera